The name Kammuri has been used to name four tropical cyclones in the northwestern Pacific Ocean. It is the Japanese term for the constellation Corona Borealis.

Severe Tropical Storm Kammuri (2002) (T0212, 16W, Lagalag)
Severe Tropical Storm Kammuri (2008) (T0809, 10W, Julian) – struck China and Vietnam.
Severe Tropical Storm Kammuri (2014) (T1417, 17W)
Typhoon Kammuri (2019) (T1928, 29W, Tisoy) – made landfall in the Bicol Region of the Philippines at peak intensity as a category 4-equivalent typhoon.

The name Kammuri was retired following the 2019 typhoon season and has been replaced with Koto, which means harp or the constellation Lyra in Japanese.

Pacific typhoon set index articles